Galvan is an Irish surname. Irish surnames have had their original forms altered in many ways. Before being translated into English, Galvan appeared as O Gealbhain, derived from the words "geal," which means "bright," and "ban," which means "white."  The surname Galvan was first found in County Clare (Irish: An Clár) located on the west coast of Ireland in the province of Munster, where they are a sept of Thomond. More recently, the family is very numerous in Kerry where it is more often spelt Gallivan. 

Spanish (Galván): from a medieval personal name. This is in origin the Latin name Galbanus (a derivative of the Roman surname Galba of uncertain origin). However it was used in a number of medieval romances as an equivalent of the Celtic name Gawain (see Gavin ) and it is probably this association that was mainly responsible for its popularity in the Middle Ages

Notable people with the surname include:

Adriana Galvan, American psychologist
Anna Galvan (born 1978), New Zealand netball player
Carlos Galván (born 1973), Argentine footballer
David Galván (born 1973), Mexican long-distance runner
Diego Galván (born 1982), Argentine footballer
Elias Gabriel Galvan (born 1938), Mexican-American Methodist bishop
Guillermo Galván Galván (born 1943), Mexican general
Israel Galván (born 1973), Spanish dancer and choreographer
Javier Galván (born 1966), Mexican politician
Jesús Galván Carrillo (born 1974), Spanish footballer
Jorge Galván (born 1966), Mexican writer and engineer
José Galván (born 1981), Argentine footballer
Juan Galván, Spanish explorer
Luis Galván (born 1948), Argentine footballer
Martín Galván (born 1993), Mexican footballer
Matteo Galvan (born 1988), Italian sprinter
Miguel Galván (1957–2008), Mexican comedian and actor
Pedro Galván (died 1892), Mexican general and politician
Pedro Joaquín Galván (born 1985), Argentine footballer
Rubén Galván (boxer) (born 1972), Mexican-American boxer
Rubén Galván (footballer) (1952–2018), Argentine footballer
Victoria Galvan (born 1986), Mexican-American singer

See also
 Galvão (Portuguese) and Galvano and Galvani (Italian)
 Galvan, a fictional alien race introduced in the second series of the Ben 10 franchise
 Galván, Dominican Republic, a town in Baoruco Province, Dominican Republic
 Galvan (fashion brand), a British fashion label

Spanish-language surnames